Pomoz Bog or Pomaže Bog (Помаже Бог) is a traditional Serbian greeting used by Serbs. It literally means "God helps" but is considered the equivalent to "hello" or "good day" in English. The typical response to the greeting is Bog ti pomogao (Бог ти помогао), "God help you".

References

See also
Serbian traditions

Serbian culture
Greeting words and phrases
Serbian words and phrases
Serb culture